Birinci Meyniman (also, Meyniman Pervoye) is a village and municipality in the Hajigabul Rayon of Azerbaijan.  It has a population of 1,408.  The municipality consists of the villages of Birinci Meyniman and Meyniman.

References 

Populated places in Hajigabul District